"Good Girls Go to Heaven (Bad Girls Go Everywhere)" is a song  written by Jim Steinman. The song was first performed by Megumi Shiina as "Kanashimi Wa Tsudzukanai" (悲しみは続かない, lit. "Sadness Doesn't Last") and used as the opening to the 1986 Japanese TV Drama "Kono Ko Dare no Ko?". It was first performed in English by Pandora's Box on their album Original Sin (1989). Group member Holly Sherwood performed lead vocals.

Like many Jim Steinman song titles, this song's title appears to be derived from a popular expression or figure of speech. "Good girls go to heaven, but bad girls go everywhere" made its way into popular culture through entertainer Mae West and also Helen Gurley Brown, author of the popular book Sex and the Single Girl.

The song was covered by Meat Loaf for Bat Out of Hell II: Back into Hell.

Megumi Shiina version
The song was first released as "Kanashimi Wa Tsudzukanai" (悲しみは続かない, lit. "Sadness Doesn't Last") in 1986 by Megumi Shiina (椎名恵). The song was used as the opening theme for the Japanese TV Drama "Kono Ko Dare no Ko?" (このこ誰の子?, lit. "Who's Child is This?"). Despite this version having a different title, the sleeve for the 7-inch single still shows the English title as "Good Girls Go to Heaven, Bad Girls Go Everywhere". The credits list Jim Steinman (as ジム・スタインマン) as composer, with the Japanese lyrics written by Keiko Aso (麻生圭子). This version was arranged by Osamu Totsuka (戸塚修).

Pandora's Box version

Girl group Pandora's Box covered the song in English and released it as a single in the United Kingdom on 19 February 1990. The song was issued as a 7-inch single that also included the instrumental tracks "Requiem Metal" and "Pray Lewd". The 12-inch single replaces "Pray Lewd" with "Pandora's House - Room By Room". This version peaked at number 100 on the UK Singles Chart.

Music video
A video for the Pandora's Box version was directed by Brian Grant. Set in a prison. It shows the arrival of a new inmate called Jenny (the name featured in the first chorus) and her induction. As the song begins, the other inmates dance around her. Holly Sherwood doesn't appear in this video. Instead, a female dancer lip-syncs to her vocals.

Personnel
 Holly Sherwood: Lead vocals
 Eddie Martinez: Guitars
 Steve Buslowe: Bass Guitars
 Roy Bittan: Grand Piano
 Jim Steinman: Keyboards
 Jeff Bova: Keyboards, Synths, Programming
 Jimmy Bralower: Drums, Programming
 Todd Rundgren, Eric Troyer, Rory Dodd: Backing Vocals

Arranged by Jim Steinman, Roy Bittan and the band
Backing vocals arranged by Todd Rundgren and Eric Troyer

Meat Loaf version

The song was recorded by American singer Meat Loaf for Bat Out of Hell II: Back into Hell, which was also produced by Steinman. The album contained two tracks from the album Original Sin, the other being "It Just Won't Quit".

The main guitar melody of this version was reused in the instrumental track on Bat II, Back into Hell. It was also the main melody of Carpe Noctem from the Steinman musical Tanz Der Vampire (which Meat also recorded as Seize the Night on Bat Out of Hell III: The Monster Is Loose, leaving the melody intact).

Personnel
 Meat Loaf: Lead Vocals
 Eddie Martinez: Guitars
 Steve Buslowe: Bass
 Roy Bittan: Piano
 Jeff Bova: Synthesizers, Programming
 Jimmy Bralower: Drums
 Lenny Pickett: Saxophones
 Todd Rundgren, Rory Dodd, Kasim Sulton, Amy Goff, Elaine Goff, Curtis King: Backing Vocals

References

1989 songs
1990 singles
1994 singles
Meat Loaf songs
Pandora's Box (band) songs
Song recordings produced by Jim Steinman
Songs written by Jim Steinman
Virgin Records singles